Souk Erbaa is one of the souks in the medina of Tunis.

Etymology 
Some historians say that the souk got its name erbaa or quarter from the fact that the quarter of the incomes in every shop was paid as a tax.
Some others believe that this name comes from the word tarbiaa that refers to the position in which the traders of this souk used to sit in front of their shops with their legs crossed.

Location 
It is located in the south of Al-Zaytuna Mosque, near Souk El Souf.

History
The souk was founded during the Hafsid era between 1128 and 1535.

Notes and references 

Erbaa